Cappahosic House, also known as Baytop House and Cappahosic Ferry House, is a historic home located near Gloucester, Gloucester County, Virginia.  It was built in around 1751, and is a two-story, three bay brick dwelling in the Georgian style.  It has a basement and is topped by a standing seam jerkinhead red tin roof.  The main block is connected in the rear to a two-story modern addition. Also on the property are contributing archaeological deposits dating principally to the 18th and 19th centuries. The house is believed to be on the site of an 18th-century ferry used to cross the York River.

It was added to the National Register of Historic Places in 2003.

References

External links
 Baytop, State Route 618, Bellamy, Gloucester County, VA at the Historic American Buildings Survey (HABS)

Houses on the National Register of Historic Places in Virginia
Archaeological sites on the National Register of Historic Places in Virginia
Georgian architecture in Virginia
Houses completed in 1751
Houses in Gloucester County, Virginia
National Register of Historic Places in Gloucester County, Virginia
Historic American Buildings Survey in Virginia
1751 establishments in Virginia